Custom Bus (previously Custom Coaches) is an Australian bus body builder in St Marys, New South Wales.

History

Cycle Components Manufacturing Company

In 1935 Stanley Hillsdon founded Cycle Components Manufacturing Company (CCMC) in Guildford, having been involved in manufacture of bicycles since 1911. In 1946 the company won the contract to manufacture reversible seats for Sydney's tram system.

In 1955 CCMC successfully tendered to body 125 single deck Leyland Royal Tiger Worldmaster buses for the NSW Department of Government Transport. In May 1956 Jack Violet, Hillsdon's nephew by marriage, was employed as Bus Divisional Manager to oversee operations. In April 1958 CCMC bodied their first bus for a private operator, a Leyland Comet for Rowes Bus Service.

Apart from six MAN SL200 and SG192s bodied for ACTION in 1982/82 as part of a contracted included when Smithfield Bus & Coach Works was purchased and 19 Scania K112TR coaches bodied for the State Rail Authority in 1985/86, CCMC built bodies exclusively for private operators after the completion of the Leyland Worldmaster contract for the next 37 years.

Custom Coaches Manufacturing Company
In 1962 control of CCMC passed from Hillsdon to Violet. At some point the business was renamed Custom Coaches Manufacturing Company, upon the suggestion of Kathleen Metcalfe, sister-in-law of Violet and niece of Hillsdon and wife of Ray Metcalfe, another employee, in order to maintain the CCMC initials. In May 1981 the Smithfield Bus & Coach Works business was purchased from the Bosnjak family. Custom Coaches concentrated on bodying buses for the private sector. In 1967 CCMC entered into an agreement with Melbourne bodybuilder WA Newnham & Sons for CCMC to provide frames and other components. CCMC also supplied components to Brisbane bodybuilder Watt Brothers in the 1960s and Perth's Howard Porter in the 1970s.

In 1988 CCMC purchased WA Newnham & Sons with the business renamed Newnham Custom. In 1995 a plant was opened at Arundel on the Gold Coast. Newnham Custom closed in 2001 with production transferred to Adelaide.

In 2000 Australian Bus Manufacturing (ABM) in Adelaide was purchased. It had been formed in 1999 when a consortium of CCMC, Jim Bosnjak and John Hewson purchased the PMC Australia business following the collapse of Clifford Corporation. Australian Bus Manufacturing was rebranded as Custom Coaches in 2004.

In 1998, Custom Coaches began bodying buses for the State Transit Authority after a break of over 37 years. By April 2013 over 1,280 had been bodied for the government operator.

In late 2001 Custom Care was established as a bus refurbishment operation.

In 2002, Mark Burgess, a great-nephew of Hillsdon by marriage, became CEO of the company. He, his brother Paul and a long-term business partner, Chris Absalom, completed the purchase of the business from Jack Violet in 2005.

In 2008 production exceeded 400 buses per year, and by 2009 the total number of buses bodied had exceeded 15,000. In May 2010 the Sydney plant moved to new premises in Villawood and in June 2012 the company was purchased by British bus manufacturer Alexander Dennis.
Custom Coaches was placed in administration in May 2014. On 15 August 2014, the business was purchased back by Mark Burgess and Allegro Funds and the company was renamed Custom Bus. The Royal Park, South Australia plant closed down in September 2014.

Dunn ownership
In February 2018, Custom Bus was again placed in administration, resulting in the sacking of 122 staff. The following month, Dunn Group purchased Custom Bus, and in May 2018, relocated its factory to St Marys. A year later, in June 2019, Custom Bus completed its 100th bus under Dunn ownership. In September 2019, Custom Bus acquired Denning Manufacturing, but the latter's branding and operations will be retained.

In February 2021 they announced the production of their first electric bus under the Custom Denning brand, the Element, which is now in production.

Products 

Source:

CB20/CB30 
The Custom CB20 was similar in design to a minivan, paired exclusively with the Mercedes-Benz 815DL chassis. Busabout currently has 2 examples in its fleet.

The Custom CB30 was available as both an 11m midibus and a 12.5m full sized bus. CDC has a sizeable fleet of MAN 12.220 midibuses with CB30 bodywork while Transdev Melbourne had many full size CB30s with MAN chassis.

The CB20 and CB30 ceased production around 2007 with no replacement vehicles provided.

CB50 
The Custom CB50 was in production from 1999-2006, replacing the Custom CB30 and the Custom Coaches 550 and being succeeded by the Custom CB60.

There were two variants, the high floor CB50 ordered in small numbers by several operators and the low floor CB50HCL which was more 

popular, with Premier Motor Service ordering 10 on Volvo B7RLE chassis. The CB50HCL had a window line similar to the Bustech VST.

CB60

Early versions 
The CB60 was produced between 1999 and 2009, succeeding the Custom Coaches 550 and being replaced by the CB80. Some of the first CB60s were produced by ABM in 1999 for Torrens Transit on MAN NL202 chassis, followed by many other examples. ABM produced many variants, the ABM CB62A was a CB60 with modified rear with Mercedes-Benz Citaro headlights and a modified front destination board mounting. The ABM CB64A was similar but with the CB60 headlights while the ABM CB60A was similar to the standard CB60.

Custom Coaches modified the CB60 in a similar way to the ABM CB62A for State Transit Authority in 1999 for their Custom Citaro vehicles (on Mercedes O405NH CNG chassis), but with the standard 

CB60 rear.

The Custom CB60 Combo was introduced after Custom Coaches dropped the ABM branding. It is the same as the ABM CB64A, but only found in articulated form.

State Transit also bought a large number of CB60 bodied Volvo B12BLE vehicles, including several articulated vehicles.

The Custom CB60 CMAX was released in 2007, first deliveries going to Busways Western Sydney on Scania K230UB Euro 3 chassis.

(They are not referred to as CMAX in the fleetlists).

The original CB60 ended production around 2008.

Evo II 

The CB60 Evo II was introduced in 2005 for State Transit on Volvo B12BLE Euro 5 chassis. The Evo II featured weight reductions compared to the original CB60 as well as new headlight styling, a slightly modified rear and minor interior changes. The CB60 Evo II is slightly taller than the original CB60.

With the introduction of the Custom CB80, the CB60 Evo II ceased production in 2009, being one of Custom's most popular bodies.

CB80 

The Custom CB80 was first revealed to the public in 2009 as a demonstrator vehicle on Mercedes O500LE chassis, which visited various depots. It was supplied by Mercedes to State Transit as a replacement unit after a Mercedes O500LE CNG Custom Coaches CB60 Evo II blew up in a fire near Hillsdale. Following privatisation, the demonstrator is now M/O 4878 with Transdev John Holland Buses.

State Transit was the first operator to order the CB80, a batch of 100 on Scania K280UB chassis were delivered in 2011. All vehicles are dual door and in Transport for NSW livery.

The CB80 was designed using 3D modelling. It is still Custom's lightest bus body and has lightweight plastic ducting. Composite materials are used extensively in the bus. It also has several innovative features such as the wireless stop bells, front wheel hump design to maximise seating space and the positioning of the rear engine grilles to maximise advertising space.

Series 2 
The CB80 Series 2 brought a range of improvements to the original CB80. It came with LED destination displays by default, had improved stop bells (the ones on the original CB80 were notorious for malfunctioning) and other minor differences.

The first CB80 Series 2 vehicles were delivered to State Transit in 2017 on Volvo B7RLE Euro 5 chassis.

The CB80 Series 2 ceased production in 2019, being replaced by the Custom Endeavour. The final CB80 was 3120 ST, a Volvo B8RLE Custom CB80 for State Transit built in April 2020.

References

External links

Bus Australia gallery

Bus manufacturers of Australia
Vehicle manufacturing companies established in 1935
Australian companies established in 1935
Manufacturing companies based in Sydney
St Marys, New South Wales